Slinker may refer to:
Ron Slinker, an American wrestler
Gollum (slinker), a character from The Lord of the Rings novel
An alternative name for the northern pike, Esox lucius